The choir Mainzer Domchor is the choir at Mainz Cathedral, of boys' and men's voices. It was founded in 1866 by the then bishop of Mainz, Wilhelm Emmanuel von Ketteler.

History 
The choir of c. 140 voices is mainly concerned with the musical part in services at the cathedral. The singers are trained in three weekly rehearsals in the Chorhaus near the cathedral. Every year, a small group of new singers is educated to join the choir. The repertoire consists of church music by Johann Sebastian Bach, Joseph Haydn, Wolfgang Amadeus Mozart, Ludwig van Beethoven, Franz Schubert and Anton Bruckner.

The choir has toured several countries in concert, including Italy, France, Belgium, Switzerland, Israel, Russia, the US, Canada and Brazil. They made several recordings, representing the repertoire.

Heinrich Hain was conductor to 1985, succeeded by Domkapellmeister Mathias Breitschaft to 2012, and then .

Literature 
 Horst-Willi Groß: Der Mainzer Domchor. In: Musica sacra 5 (1975), pp 315–317
 Mathias Breitschaft, Elmar Frey: Mainzer Domchor: 125 Jahre. Schmidt & Bödige, Mainz 1991

Recordings 
 Gesänge zum Fest des Hl. Martinus: Hymnus "Fratres unanimes", Antiphon "O beatum pontificem". Choralschola des Mainzer Domchores (conductor: Horst Willi Groß), in: Horst Willi Groß und Heinrich Hain: Choralschola des Mainzer Domchores. Glocken des Mainzer Domes. Seite A, Tonstudio Orgelbau-Vleugels GmbH (= OV 42), Hardheim-Rügental 1976
 Musica Sacra im Hohen Dom zu Mainz. Mainzer Domchor (Conductor: Heinrich Hain), Mainzer Dommusik (conductor: Heino Schneider), Pallas-Verlag, Diepholz
 Wilhelm Petersen: Grosse Messe für 4 Solostimmen, Chor, Orchester und Orgel op. 27, Wergo-Schallplatten, Mainz, 1992
 Lobet den Herren – geistliche Chöre und festliche Klänge, BMG Ariola Hamburg, München, 1999 
Sanctus, BMG Ariola Hamburg, München, 1999
 Carl Orff: Carmina burana, Hr-Media, Frankfurt (Main), 2003

References

External links 
 
 
 Müllers im Netz: List of conductors

Church choirs
1866 establishments in Germany